David Paul Russell (born 4 June 1951) is an English former first-class cricketer.

While studying at the University of Cambridge, Russell made his debut in first-class cricket for Cambridge University against Leicestershire at Fenner's in 1974. He played first-class cricket for Cambridge until 1975, making sixteen appearances. He scored 514 runs at an average of 19.76 in his sixteen matches, with a high score of 56 not out. With his right-arm medium pace bowling, he took 16 wickets at a bowling average of 59.50, with best figures of 3 for 60. While at Cambridge, Russell also played List A one-day cricket, making four appearances for Cambridge University in the 1974 Benson & Hedges Cup and four appearances for the Combined Universities in the 1975 Benson & Hedges Cup. He scored 45 runs in these eight matches, as well as taking 6 wickets. In addition to playing first-class and List A cricket, Russell also played minor counties cricket for Cambridgeshire in 1976, making a single appearance in the Minor Counties Championship.

References

External links

1951 births
Living people
Alumni of the University of Cambridge
British Universities cricketers
Cambridge University cricketers
Cambridgeshire cricketers
Cricketers from St Helens, Merseyside
English cricketers